"Snap Yo Fingers" is a 2006 American hip hop single by Atlanta-based rapper/producer Lil Jon. It was originally intended to be the first single from Lil Jon's solo debut album, Crunk Rock. However, the release date of Crunk Rock was subsequently delayed. In August 2006, Lil Jon's label TVT Records released the second volume of its Crunk Hits rap compilation, and "Snap Yo Fingers" was the opening track.  When Crunk Rock was finally released four years later, the song was left out of the album.

The song was produced by Lil Jon and features E-40 and Sean P. The catchy, up-tempo and club oriented Southern hip hop track allowed the song to peak at number 7 on the U.S. Billboard Hot 100.

On the Billboard Hot 100 and Hot R&B/Hip-Hop Songs charts, the song reached number seven and one, respectively. The music video was directed by Hype Williams.

Remix
The official remix features additional vocals by Lil Jon and verses by rappers Sun-E and Chyna Whyte.

Track listing
"Snap Yo Fingers" (Radio Edit) - 4:34  	
"Snap Yo Fingers" (Explicit version) - 4:34 	
"Snap Yo Fingers" (Instrumental version) - 4:34 	
"Snap Yo Fingers" (A cappella version) - 4:09

Chart positions

Weekly charts

Year-end charts

Certifications

References

2006 singles
Lil Jon songs
E-40 songs
Songs written by Lil Jon
Song recordings produced by Lil Jon
Snap songs
TVT Records singles
Music videos directed by Hype Williams
Crunk songs
2005 songs
Hip hop dance
Songs about dancing